José María del Castillo y Rada (December 20, 1776 in Cartagena de Indias – June 5, 1833 in Bogotá) was a neo-granadine politician, President of the United Provinces of the New Granada from October 5, 1814 until January 21, 1815. Castillo y Rada also served as Vice President of the Republic of Colombia from June 6, 1821 until October 3, 1821.

1776 births
1833 deaths
Del Rosario University alumni
Vice presidents of Colombia
Presidents of Colombia
Colombian economists
19th-century Colombian lawyers
People of the Colombian War of Independence